Trigeminal trophic syndrome is a rare disease caused by the interruption of peripheral or central sensory pathways of the trigeminal nerve.  A slowly enlarging, uninflammed ulcer can occur in the area that has had trigeminal nerve damage; including but not limited to the cheek beside the ala nasi. These sores affect the skin supplied by the sensory component of the trigeminal nerve.  Similar lesions may also occur in the corners of the eyes, inside the ear canal, on the scalp or inside the mouth.

It has been stated that the ulceration is due to the constant "picking" of the patient. While this does occur, the picking behavior is an incomplete explanation of the disease presentation: the lack of feeling or pain allows the patient to continue scratching or picking the area, and, although there is no feeling, there is constant neuropathic pain.

Sixty cases were reported from 1982 to 2002.

See also
 Trigeminal neuralgia (Tic douloureux)
 Skin lesion
 List of cutaneous conditions
 Somatosensory system

References 

Neurocutaneous conditions
Syndromes